is a Japanese actress, TV personality and was also a former AV idol who was very popular in the early 2000s.

Life and career 
Nao Oikawa was born in Hiroshima. Her family moved to Tokyo when she was a little girl. At age 18, when she graduated from high school and began design school, she met a scout who proposed she become an AV idol. "That time, my hair was bleached and curly. My agency told me to get my hair back to straight black. One day in the office, one staff picked Oikawa as family name from a book, another staff picked Nao from another book. This is where my stage name came from."

AV career 
 Debut
Oikawa's debut was not easy. AV producers did not think that she had special talent in their genre. She used her time for studying popular porn stars' acting (especially, she learned many things from Kurumi Morishita).
Finally, Oikawa made her debut adult video at age nineteen for the Media Station Cosmos Plan label in September 2000. Then she released some videos from Alice Japan, Momotaro, etc., but she could not get big success. In her first year of adult work, she made only a few videos, including a softcore V-Cinema movie, Virgin Teacher Hinako in September 2001.

 Taking off
In Spring 2002, Oikawa began an association with the new KMP Million label, most of them under the direction of Goro Tameike. She said that Tameike showed her the way to go. Her first video with KMP and Tameike, Another Side of Nao Oikawa, involved anal sex and forced fellatio. One of her male partners is famed porn actor Taka Kato About same time, she began to work with Soft On Demand and Moodyz which produced her most popular AV works. More than half of her AV work are produced in 2002.

 KMP exclusive
In Spring 2003, Oikawa signed exclusive contract with KMP which continued until her retirement. Together with Ran Monbu, Saori Kamiya and Hitomi Hayasaka, she was part of the exclusive group of actresses that KMP used for promotion under the name . Another Side of Nao Oikawa 2, was even more hardcore with lesbian strap-on sex, forced fellatio and vomiting, multiple partner fellatio and vibrator play. Once again Taka Kato takes part in the action. On a gentler note, Oikawa appeared with Kurumi Morishita in a June 2003 production by KMP entitled Forest in Nude. Directed by TOHJIRO, this lesbian genre video is a "soft, bittersweet story of two friends who remember the days of their youth and the sexual experiences they had".

 Popularity and recognition
At her peak, Oikawa was one of the most popular and well-known AV Idols in Japan. In 2003 (the earliest date available) she was #1 in the DMM list of the 100 top-ranked actresses by sales on their website. In 2004, even though she had retired in mid-year, she was still ranked #2, and even in 2005 she made the top 50 at #42. There have since been numerous re-issues and compilations of her earlier videos.
Oikawa, along with fellow AV actress Mariko Kawana, actor Taka Kato, director Goro Tameike and Soft On Demand founder Ganari Takahashi, was among the 17 people interviewed for Misato Nakayama's study of professionals in the adult industry, published in January 2006 by Ohzora.

In 2012, the major Japanese adult video distributor DMM held a poll of its customers to choose the 100 all-time best AV actresses to celebrate the 30th anniversary of adult videos in Japan. Oikawa finished in 42nd place in the voting.

Actress and TV personality 
 TV appearances
Like AV idols Nana Natsume and Sora Aoi, Oikawa has been able to use her fame in the AV industry to enter mainstream media work. Soon after her retirement from adult videos, she acted in and directed an episode of the Japanese TV horror series Fantazuma: Cursed House or Fantazuma: Noroi no yakata (ファンタズマ〜呪いの館〜) which aired on TV Tokyo in July 2004. She also played a role in the 2004 comedy-horror TV series  directed by Takashi Shimizu on TV Tokyo.
From 2005 to 2006, Oikawa appeared on various midnight TV show including Ikari Oyaji 3.

 SFX actress
On November 11, 2005 Oikawa made a guest appearance in the 6th episode of GARO. It was her first appearance on Tokusatsu sfx series. GARO'''s action director Makoto Yokoyama says Oikawa's supple body is suitable to sfx action. On November 9, 2007 she made a guest appearance in the 6th episode of Tsuburaya Productions mini-series Ultraseven X.Oikawa was cast as Negi's advisor "Shizuna Minamoto" in the 2007-08 late-night TV Tokyo series Negima!: Magister Negi Magi based on the manga of the same name about a young male wizard from Wales (Negi, played by a 13-year-old girl) and his 31 female students.

Not same as above are all midnight dramas, Oikawa played the role of villainess Kegalesia in the TV Asahi tokusatsu TV series for kids Engine Sentai Go-onger which ran from February 17, 2008, through February 8, 2009. In the September 21, 2008 episode, Oikawa and her co-stars Rina Aizawa and Yumi Sugimoto teamed up as the one-off G3 Princess singing group, releasing both an EP and a CD box set featuring the group's song G3 Princess Rap ~Pretty Love Limited~ and Oikawa's solo character song Utopia. She also appeared in the Kamen Rider Decade epilogue portion of the December 2009 film Kamen Rider × Kamen Rider W & Decade: Movie War 2010 as the Bee Woman of Shocker.

 Other activities
From November to December 2007 Oikawa performed her first lead stage role in a three-person drama called Night Mess. In September 2010 she will take a role in a vampire drama called Blood Prisoner. Some staff members and actors in both dramas are tokusatsu specialists.

Oikawa's family enjoys playing Mahjong as a recreational activity. As a result, she has over 20 years' experience playing the game. Using this experience, she frequently appears in Mahjong related V-Cinemas, TV shows, and various events.

 Filmography 

 Film and V-Cinema 

TV Drama

 Variety DVD 

 Adult videos 

Note
(1) Cosmos Plan: Partially included in "Maximum Nao Oikawa"(ASIN:B0029AJQ2C).
(2) Alice Japan: Partially included in "Alice Pink File Nao Oikawa"(ASIN:B003L14PME).
(3) Alice Japan: Remastered and reproduced with original title.
(4) Momotaro: Included in "Scramble" 1, 2(ASIN:B001HQLV36, B001KEM0GM).
(5) TMA: Included in "Nao Oikawa History History 16 Hours"(ASIN:B003BLEARY).
(6) Moodyz: Partially included in "Hyper Digital Mosaic 4 Hours"(ASIN:B000M9BN7S).
(7) Moodyz: Included in "Perfect Collection 8 Hours"(ASIN:B001W00692).
(8) TMA: Remastered and reproduced with original title.
(9) KMP: Remastered and reproduced with original title ('Timeless masterpiece' series).
(10) SOD: Partially included in "Digital Remaster Director's Cut 8 Hours"(ASIN:B003U3NAMO).
(11) AUDAZ JAPAN: Remastered and reproduced with original title.
(12) KMP: Partially included in "All About Nao Oikawa" 1, 2(ASIN:B002C8YURC, B002F7IAC6).
(13) Maxing: Included in "Star File Nao Oikawa"(ASIN:B004B7ZRT2).
(14) ROOKIE: Included in "Kiseki - Nao Oikawa Super Collection 8 Hours Special".
(15) ROOKIE: Partially included in "Kiseki - Nao Oikawa Super Collection 8 Hours Special".

 Talk show 

 Stage 

 Photobooks 

 Discography 

 Miscellaneous 
 Miku and Ran: Scenario for cartoon on internet. Serialized from March 2009.
 NAO OIKAWA'S FRUIT SCANDAL - Pachinko Machine (Heiwa Corporation): From 2009 summer to 2010 winter, for 3 versions, total 20,000 machines supposed to be shipped.
 A Letter from Ancient Capital Kyoto'': Photograph, Reading poetry by Nao Oikawa, Music by Tsugutoshi Goto, Phone-Cast from April 27, 2010.

Notes

Sources

External links
  
  
 Nao Oikawa at Sony Music Artist 
 G3 Princess at Columbia Music Entertainment 

1981 births
Living people
Japanese pornographic film actresses
Japanese television personalities